Lucky Chinatown is a lifestyle mall development of Megaworld Lifestyle Malls located along Reina Regente Street corner Dela Reina Street in Binondo, Manila.

Awarded the Shopping Center of the Year by the Philippine Retailers Association in 2015, Lucky Chinatown is the first full-scale lifestyle mall in the world’s oldest Chinatown. It is designed to offer a blend of history, tradition and modern shopping, dining and leisure experience. The four-level, 108,000-square-metre (1,160,000 sq ft) shopping mall is envisioned as a heritage project that promotes Binondo’s tradition of commerce and tourism during modern times.

Description

Shopping
It houses a wide selection of international fashion brands and high-end shopping to a part of the Manila known for bargain centers and budget shopping. Lucky Chinatown also has establishments that cater to home improvement, convenience, as well as beauty and wellness. For budget shopping and pop up kiosks popular in Divisoria and other Chinatown markets in the world, Lucky Chinatown has the Annex A building for those.

Dining and entertainment

Aside from shopping, Lucky Chinatown serves a variety of high end dining offerings with a mix of Asian, European and Oriental cuisines as well as a roster of coffee shops, tea houses, quick-service restaurants and confectionary stores for more affordable meal options. For entertainment, Lucky Chinatown is equipped with four upscale movie theaters. Among the striking features of Lucky Chinatown Cinemas are the Emperor Twin Seats designed to accommodate two people with retractable middle armrests.

Binondo’s Community Center

Lucky Chinatown also hosts community events – from small civic gatherings and activities to annual large-scale and traditional Chinese celebrations.

 Buddha’s Birthday – Lucky Chinatown hosts two celebrations in honor of the birthday of Buddha every May. The event is highlighted by the traditional bathing of the Buddha, where mall patrons are also able to participate.
 Parian sa Binondo – Lucky Chinatown is a venue of the annual celebration of the National Heritage Month on May 19. The word “parian” is derived from the old Malay word similar to Filipino language “puntahan” or “padiyan,” which translates to going to a place of festivity. The event features cultural and traditional performances from Binondo-based schools and organizations.
 Mid-Autumn Festival – The annual Mid-Autumn Festival is one of the biggest celebrations in Chinatown. The event hosts a variety of cultural activities including lantern and mural painting contests for young students, mooncake baking competition, cultural performances and traditional dice games. The festival also features a Mooncake Fair, where guests are able to enjoy different kinds of this delicacy traditionally eaten during Mid-Autumn celebrations.  On Sept. 2015, the Lucky Chinatown Mid Autumn Festival display, called Lanterns of Hope, set a Guinness World Record for the largest display of origami lanterns at 19,552.
 Chinese New Year  - Since 2012, Lucky Chinatown celebrates the annual Chinese New Year with a Chinese New Year countdown event featuring lucky rituals, cultural events, food fairs, live bands and a grand fireworks display.

Chinatown Walk

The Chinatown Walk, is a promenade within Lucky Chinatown where people can try Filipino - Chinese products. It  is inspired by Hong Kong and Shanghai market alleys where Chinese merchants sell exotic Chinese delicacies, herbal medicine, and street food. The design and layout is also inspired by the Manila Chinatown of the past.

Chinatown Museum 
Chinatown Museum is a newly opened museum located at the fourth level of Lucky Chinatown Annex Building A. The country’s first cultural museum is dedicated to the ‘World’s Oldest Chinatown’. The Chinatown Museum features 18 galleries, with each focusing on various influences and historical events that have shaped the cultural, social and economic threads of Binondo – from its establishment as a settlement for Christianized Chinese to the height of downtown Escolta on its way to becoming a bustling commercial downtown of colonial Manila.

The new cultural landmark, recognized by the National Historical Commission and National Commission for the Culture and the Arts, is envisioned as a community space and heritage project that lends a visual retelling of the rich history of Binondo.

Chinatown Museum is the second museum venture of Megaworld Corporation following the opening of the Iloilo Museum for Contemporary Art (ILOMOCA), the first museum of its kind in the Visayas and Mindanao region, inside its Iloilo Business Park township in Mandurriao, Iloilo City.

Chinatown Museum is connected directly to the main mall of Lucky Chinatown via a bridgeway at the fourth level and the newly-opened Hotel Lucky Chinatown.

Anchors
 Metro Supermarket
 Lucky Chinatown Cinemas
 SM Appliances
 Toy Kingdom
 158 Designer's Blvd.

Gallery

References

External links
 Lucky Chinatown Official Website

Shopping malls in Manila
Buildings and structures in Binondo
Shopping malls established in 2012
2012 establishments in the Philippines